The first election to the Carmarthen Rural District Council in Carmarthenshire, Wales was held in December 1894. It was followed by the 1898 election. The successful candidates were also elected to the Carmarthen Board of Guardians. In rural parishes, many councillors were returned unopposed.

The rural district included the parishes of Abergwili, Abernant, Cynwyl Elfed, Laugharne, Llanarthney, Llanddarog, Llandyfaelog, Llanddowror, Llanfihangel Abercowyn, Llangain, Llangyndeyrn, Llangynog (with Llandeilo Abercywyn), Llangynin, Llangunnor, Llanllawddog, Llanpumsaint, Llansteffan, Llanwinio, Merthyr, Meidrym, Newchurch, St Clears, St Ishmaels, and Trelech a'r Betws.

Outcome
The majority of those elected to the first Rural District Council were farmers. Women were eligible to stand in contests for district councils, and in St Ishmaels, Elizabeth Mary Gwyn was successful by a small majority. Political affiliations were generally not declared during the election.

Due to "a curious blunder" no councillor was elected to represent the Llandawke and Llansadurnen ward.

The 1894-98 Council
The first meeting of the authority took place at the Shire Hall, Carmarthen on 29 December 1894. A vote was taken to elect a chairman, and John Phillips of Caerlleon, Llanwinio defeated David E. Stephens by sixteen votes to ten. Phillips was a prominent Liberal who was also a member of Carmarthenshire County Council. Stephens, in contrast, had stood unsuccessfully in county elections at Llangunnor in 1889 and Cynwyl Elfed in 1892.

Ward Results

Abergwili (two seats)

Abernant (one seat)

Conwil (two seats)

Laugharne Parish (one seat)

Laugharne Township (one seat)
Morse withdrew too late to avoid a poll.

Llanarthney (two seats)

Llandawke and Llansadurnen (one seat)
No nominations were received.

Llanddarog (one seat)

Llandeilo Abercowyn and Llangynog (one seat)

Llanddowror (one seat)

Llandyfaelog (one seat)
It was reported that the contest had been instigated after Rees defeated the local Independent minister, Evan Powell, at a parish meeting.

Llanfihangel Abercowin (one seat)

Llangain (one seat)

Llangendeirne (two seats)

Llangunnor (one seat)

Llangynin (one seat)

Llanllawddog (one seat)

Llanpumsaint (one seat)

Llanstephan (one seat)

Llanwinio (one seat)

Merthyr (one seat)

Mydrim (one seat)

Newchurch (one seat)

St Clears (one seat)

St Ishmaels (one seat)

Carmarthen Board of Guardians

All members of the District Council also served as members of Carmarthen Board of Guardians. In addition, six members were elected to represent the borough of Carmarthen. Edith Hancock was a member of a prominent Carmarthen family, being the daughter of David Archard Williams, incumbent of St David's Church for 37 years until his death in 1879

Carmarthen (six seats)

References

Elections in Carmarthenshire
1894 Welsh local elections
19th century in Carmarthenshire